This list of historical markers installed by the National Historical Commission of the Philippines (NHCP) in Central Visayas (Region VII) is an annotated list of people, places, or events in the region that have been commemorated by cast-iron plaques issued by the said commission. The plaques themselves are permanent signs installed in publicly visible locations on buildings, monuments, or in special locations.

While many Cultural Properties have historical markers installed, not all places marked with historical markers are designated into one of the particular categories of Cultural Properties.

The first historical marker in the Cebuano Language was unveiled in 2008 for the Cebu Provincial Capitol, Cebu City. Another marker in the same language was unveiled for Carcel de Cebu the next year.

The site of the historical marker of the Sandugo, or the blood compact between Sikatuna and Legazpi became an issue because of the NHCP board resolution that the event site was located off the waters of Loay and not Tagbilaran. Despite the resolution, the marker remains in its original place.

This article lists ninety-eight (98) markers from Central Visayas.

Bohol
This article lists twenty-nine (29) markers from the Province of Bohol.

Cebu
This article lists fifty-six (56) markers from the Province of Cebu.

Negros Oriental
This article lists eleven (11) markers from the Province of Negros Oriental.

Siquijor
This article lists two (2) markers from the Province of Siquijor

See also
 List of Cultural Properties of the Philippines in Central Visayas

References

Footnotes

Bibliography 
 
 
 A list of sites and structures with historical markers, as of 16 January 2012
 A list of institutions with historical markers, as of 16 January 2012

External links
 A list of sites and structures with historical markers, as of 16 January 2012
 A list of institutions with historical markers, as of 16 January 2012
 National Registry of Historic Sites and Structures in the Philippines
 Policies on the Installation of Historical Markers

Central Visayas
Central Visayas